The UAE Sportbike Championship is a motorcycle racing series based in the United Arab Emirates and held throughout the winter. It is run by the Dubai Autodrome Sports Club, held on different configurations of the circuit. Riders compete onboard bikes from various manufacturers including Kawasaki,  Triumph and Yamaha.

Champions

Stock 600 class

Rookie Cup

External links
 Facebook page

Motorsport in Asia
Recurring sporting events established in 2007
Motorsport in the United Arab Emirates